Tajay Gayle (born 2 August 1996) is a Jamaican long jumper and the 2019 World Champion.

Biography
Gayle was born in Kingston, Jamaica. He is a graduate of Papine High School in Kingston and he is a member of the MVP track club. He is coached by Stephen Francis, who is the former coach of Olympic and World Champion Elaine Thompson-Herah. On September 28, 2019, Gayle became the first Jamaican man to win a World Championship gold in the long jump.

Career
He became an 8-meter jumper in 2017, improving from  the year before.

He claimed the gold in an upset of the heavily favored Cuban long jumper Juan Miguel Echevarría. He also beat the 2016 Olympic champion Jeff Henderson and the 2017 World Champion Luvo Manyonga. His  jump put him at number 10 in the IAAF all-time list.

At the 2020 Tokyo Olympics, he got an injury at his first jump at the qualifying round. He managed to do a  jump at his third attempt, then did  at the final round to rank 11th.

References

External links
 

1996 births
Living people
Jamaican male long jumpers
Athletes (track and field) at the 2018 Commonwealth Games
Commonwealth Games competitors for Jamaica
Athletes (track and field) at the 2019 Pan American Games
Pan American Games silver medalists for Jamaica
Pan American Games medalists in athletics (track and field)
World Athletics Championships athletes for Jamaica
World Athletics Championships medalists
Sportspeople from Kingston, Jamaica
World Athletics Championships winners
Medalists at the 2019 Pan American Games
Athletes (track and field) at the 2020 Summer Olympics
Olympic athletes of Jamaica
20th-century Jamaican people
21st-century Jamaican people